Shuixiu Township is a township of Taigu District, Jinzhong in central Shanxi province, China. , it has 13 villages under its administration.
Shuixiu Village
Beiguo Village
Donghuaiyuan Village
Taipingzhuang Village
Bai Village
Nanguo Village
Zhangjiazhuang Village
Fengjiapu Village
Xiaowangpu Village
Beiliumen Village
Huojiapu Village
Tuanchang Village
Guojiapu Village

See also 
 List of township-level divisions of Shanxi

References 

Township-level divisions of Shanxi
Jinzhong